Sergei Korolev initially promoted the Soyuz A-B-V circumlunar complex (7K-9K-11K) concept (also known as L1) in which a two-man craft Soyuz 7K would rendezvous with other components (9K and 11K) in Earth orbit to assemble a lunar excursion vehicle, the components being delivered by the proven R-7 rocket. 

Besides the Soyuz 7K spacecraft, the complex would feature a Soyuz 9K booster and a Soyuz 11K tanker with twin whip antennas.

The 7K would have been equipped with cameras and sensors to study the lunar surface during the flyby, at a distance of 1,000 to 20,000 km from the Moon's surface. Total flight time would have been 7 to 8 days.

Relation with other Soyuz versions

Soyuz A is the base concept for the entire Soyuz spacecraft family. The 7K series is a direct descendant of this original proposal.  
The list below shows proposed, flown (in bold) and military (in italic) Soyuz versions. 

Soyuz-A (1963)
Soyuz P (1962)
Soyuz PPK (1964)
Soyuz R (1962)
Soyuz 7K-TK (1966)
Soyuz 7K-VI Zvezda (1964) 
Soyuz OIS (1967) 
Soyuz OB-VI (1967)
Soyuz 7K-S (1974)
Soyuz 7K-ST (1974)
Soyuz T (1976-86)
Soyuz TM (1986-02)
Soyuz TMA (2002-12)
Soyuz TMA-M (2010-16)
Soyuz MS (2016-...)
Progress M (1989-09)
Progress M1 (2000-14)
Progress MS (2015)
Soyuz 7K-LOK (1967)
Soyuz 7K-L1 (1967-70)
Soyuz 7K-L1E (1970-71)
Soyuz 7K-OK (1967-71)
Soyuz 7K-OKS (1971)
Soyuz 7K-T (1973-81)
Progress 7K-TG (1978-90)
Soyuz 7K-TM (1975)

See also 
Soyuz 9K
Soyuz 11K
Soyuz programme
Soyuz (spacecraft)
Parom
Progress (spacecraft)

References

Crewed spacecraft
Soyuz program
Soviet lunar program